Anki (/ˈɒŋkiː/; Japanese: [aŋki]) is a free and open-source flashcard program using spaced repetition, a technique from cognitive science for memorization. The name comes from the Japanese word for "memorization".

The SM-2 algorithm, created for SuperMemo in the late 1980s, forms the basis of the spaced repetition methods employed in the program. Anki's implementation of the algorithm has been modified to allow priorities on cards and to show flashcards in order of their urgency.

The cards are presented using HTML and may include text, images, sounds, videos, and LaTeX equations. The decks of cards, along with the user's statistics, are stored in the open SQLite format.

Features

Notes
Cards are generated from information stored as "notes". Notes are analogous to database entries and can have an arbitrary number of fields. For example, with respect to learning a language, a note may have the following fields and example entries:
 Field 1: Expression in target language – 
 Field 2: Pronunciation – [sound file with the word  pronounced]
 Field 3: Meaning of expression in familiar language – "cake"
This example illustrates what some programs call a three-sided flashcard, but Anki's model is more general and allows any number of fields to be combined in various cards.

The user can design cards that test the information contained in each note. One card may have a question (expression) and an answer (pronunciation, meaning).

By keeping the separate cards linked to the same fact, spelling mistakes can be adjusted against all cards at the same time, and Anki can ensure that related cards are not shown in too short a spacing.

A special note type allows generation of cloze deletion cards (in Anki 1.2.x, those were ordinary cards with cloze markup added using a tool in the fact editor).

Syncing
Anki supports synchronization with a free (but proprietary) online service called AnkiWeb. This allows users to keep decks synchronized across multiple computers and to study online or on a cell phone.

There also is a third-party open-source (AGPLv3) AnkiWeb alternative, called ankisyncd, which users can run on their own local computers or servers.

Japanese and Chinese reading generation
Anki can automatically fill in the reading of Japanese and Chinese text. Since version 0.9.9.8.2, these features are in separate plug-ins.

Add-ons
More than 750 add-ons for Anki are available, often written by third-party developers. They provide support for speech synthesis, enhanced user statistics, image occlusion, incremental reading, more efficient editing and creation of cards through batch editing, modifying the GUI, simplifying import of flashcards from other digital sources, adding an element of gamification, etc.

Shared decks 
While Anki's user manual encourages the creation of one's own decks for most material, there is still a large and active database of shared decks that users can download and use. Available decks range from foreign-language decks (often constructed with frequency tables) to geography, physics, biology, chemistry and more. Various medical science decks, often made by multiple users in collaboration, are also available.

Comparisons
Anki's current scheduling algorithm is derived from SM-2 (an older version of the SuperMemo algorithm), though the algorithm has been significantly changed from SM-2 and is also far more configurable. One of the most apparent differences is that while SuperMemo provides users a 6-point grading system (0 through 5, inclusive), Anki only provides at most 4 grades (again, hard, good, and easy). Anki also has significantly changed how review intervals grow and shrink (making many of these aspects of the scheduler configurable through deck options), though the core algorithm is still based on SM-2's concept of ease factors as the primary mechanism of evolving card review intervals.

Anki was originally based on the SM-5 algorithm, but the implementation was found to have seemingly incorrect behaviour (harder cards would have their intervals grow more quickly than easier cards in certain circumstances) leading the authors to switch Anki's algorithm to SM-2 (which was further evolved into the modern Anki algorithm). At the time, this led Elmes to claim that SM-5 and later algorithms were flawed which was strongly rebutted by Piotr Woźniak, the author of SuperMemo. Since then, Elmes has clarified that it is possible that the flaw was due to a bug in their implementation of SM-5 (the SuperMemo website does not describe SM-5 in complete detail), but added that due to licensing requirements Anki will not use any newer versions of the SuperMemo algorithm. The prospect of community-funded licensing of newer SuperMemo algorithms is often discussed among users. However, there exists a greater focus on development of the software itself and its features. The latest SuperMemo algorithm in 2019 is SM-18.

Some Anki users who have experimented with the Anki algorithm and its settings have published configuration recommendations, made add-ons to modify Anki's algorithm, or developed their own separate software.

Mobile versions
The following smartphone/tablet and Web clients are available as companions to the desktop version:

 AnkiMobile for iPhone, iPod touch or iPad (paid)
 AnkiWeb (online server, free to use; includes add-on and deck hosting)
 AnkiDroid for Android (free of charge, under GPLv3; by Nicolas Raoul)

The flashcards and learning progress can be synchronized both ways with Anki using AnkiWeb. With AnkiDroid it is possible to have the flashcards read in several languages using text-to-speech (TTS). If a language does not exist in the Android TTS engine (e.g. Russian in the Android version Ice Cream Sandwich), a different TTS engine  such as SVOX TTS Classic can be used.

History
The oldest mention of Anki that the developer Damien Elmes could find in 2011 was dated 5 October 2006, which was thus declared Anki's birthdate.

Version 2.0 was released on 6 October 2012.

Version 2.1 was released on 6 August 2018.

Utility 
While Anki may primarily be used for language learning or a classroom setting, many have reported other uses for Anki: scientist Michael Nielsen uses it to remember complex topics in a fast-moving field, while others are using it to remember memorable quotes, the faces of business partners or medical residents, or to remember business interviewing strategies.

In 2010, Roger Craig obtained the then-all-time record for single-day winnings on the quiz show Jeopardy! after using Anki to memorize a vast number of facts.

Medical education 
Anki is an important resource for many medical students in the US. A study in 2015 at Washington University School of Medicine found that 31% of students who responded to a medical education survey reported using Anki as a study resource. The same study found a positive relationship between the number of unique Anki cards studied and USMLE Step 1 scores in a multi-variate analysis. Some third-party resources, such as Boards and Beyond, have Anki decks based on them. One Anki deck developed by students at the University of Utah School of Medicine, AnKing, aggregates information from multiple third-party resources and has become the primary method of USMLE Step1 and Step2 study for many students, having been downloaded over 200,000 times as of 2021.

Copera Inc.'s Anki for Palm OS
An unrelated flashcard program called Anki for Palm OS was created by Copera, Inc. (formerly known as Cooperative Computers, Inc.) and released at the PalmSource conference in February 2002.  Anki for Palm OS was sold from 2002 to 2006 as a commercial product. In late 2007, Copera, Inc. decided to release Anki for Palm OS as freeware.

See also
List of flashcard software
Computer-assisted language learning

References

Further reading 

 Gary Wolf (21 April 2008). "Want to Remember Everything You'll Ever Learn? Surrender to This Algorithm". Wired. ISSN 1059-1028. Retrieved 20 May 2022. 
  (part 2)

External links 

 
 AnkiMobile Flashcards on the App Store
 SM2 Algorithm
 Anki Algorithm
 

Spaced repetition software
Free software programmed in Python
Educational software that uses Qt
Free educational software
Free and open-source Android software
Software using the GNU AGPL license
Free software programmed in Rust